Oubritenga is one of the 45 provinces of Burkina Faso, located in its Plateau-Central Region.

Its capital is Ziniaré.

Departments

Oubritenga is divided into 7 departments:
 Absouya
 Dapélogo
 Loumbila
 Nagréongo
 Ourgou-Manèga
 Ziniaré
 Zitenga

See also
Regions of Burkina Faso
Provinces of Burkina Faso
Departments of Burkina Faso

References

 
Provinces of Burkina Faso